The 2022–23 Illinois State Redbirds men's basketball team represented Illinois State University during the 2022–23 NCAA Division I men's basketball season. The Redbirds played their home games at Doug Collins Court at CEFCU Arena in Normal, Illinois as members of the Missouri Valley Conference. They were led by first-year head coach Ryan Pedon. They finished the season 11–21, 6–14 in MVC play to finish in ninth place. They lost to Northern Iowa in the opening round of the MVC tournament.

Previous season 
The Redbirds finished the 2021–22 season 13–20, 5–13 in MVC play to finish in eighth place. They defeated Indiana State in the first round of the MVC tournament before losing to Northern Iowa in the quarterfinals.

Head coach Dan Muller was fired by the school after the first 26 games of the season after 10 years as head coach, but the school stated he would finish out the season. A day later, Muller announced he would step down immediately and associate head coach Brian Jones was named interim coach for the remainder of the season. On March 7, 2022, the school named Ohio State assistant coach Ryan Pedon as the team's new head coach.

Preseason 
The Redbirds were picked to finish in 10th place in the conference's preseason poll.

Roster

Incoming transfers

Schedule and results

|-
!colspan=9 style=|Exhibition

|-
!colspan=9 style=|Regular season

|-
!colspan=12 style=| MVC Tournament

Source

References

Illinois State Redbirds
Illinois State Redbirds men's basketball seasons
Illinois State Redbirds men's basketball